Palmgrove is a national park in south-central Queensland, Australia.  It lies about 185 km north-north-east of Roma and 458 km north-west of Brisbane.  It is listed as a National Park (Scientific) under the Nature Conservation Act 1992, so giving it the highest level of protection possible under the Act.  It was established in order to protect species and ecosystems of exceptional scientific value.  It is located within the Dawson River catchment area.

Description
Palmgrove lies in moderately dry, dissected sandstone country.  The vegetation includes a variety of eucalypt woodland and forest communities as well as vine and Acacia thickets.  The area is rugged and isolated; access is difficult and the park is not open to the general public.

Flora and fauna
Threatened ecosystems present in the park include:
 Acacia harpophylla - Eucalyptus cambageana open forest to woodland on fine-grained sedimentary rocks
 Semi-evergreen vine thicket on fine grained sedimentary rocks
 Acacia harpophylla and/or Casuarina cristata open forest on fine-grained sedimentary rocks
 Macropteranthes leichhardtii thicket on fine grained sedimentary rocks
 Semi-evergreen vine thicket in sheltered habitats on medium to coarse-grained sedimentary rocks

Northern quolls have been recorded in the park.

Important Bird Area
The park has been identified by BirdLife International as an Important Bird Area (IBA) because it supports an isolated, and the westernmost, population (over 10 pairs) of black-breasted buttonquails, listed as vulnerable.  The rare and threatened ecosystems contained in the park are buttonquail habitat.  Glossy black cockatoos, also considered to be vulnerable, are present.

See also

 Protected areas of Queensland

References

National parks of Central Queensland
Protected areas established in 1991
1991 establishments in Australia
Important Bird Areas of Queensland